Nomenia is a genus of moths in the family Geometridae erected by Richard F. Pearsall in 1905. The genus was previously treated as a junior synonym of Venusia.

Species
Nomenia duodecimlineata (Packard, 1873)
Nomenia obsoleta Swett, 1916

References

Asthenini